The Yale Center for Emotional Intelligence is a research center at Yale University in New Haven, Connecticut. It was established in 2013 by research psychologist Dr. Mark Brackett.

YCEI has been referred to as "home to the original scientific theory of emotional intelligence". It offers free trainings in social-emotional learning to grade school teachers and students, with the goal of designing "effective approaches for supporting school communities in understanding the value of emotions, teaching the skills of emotional intelligence, and building and sustaining positive emotional climates in homes, schools, and workplaces."

Its research focuses on four research categories: assessment; school and the workplace; creativity; and RULER, the center's defining approach to social emotional learning. 

The YCEI is funded by foundation and federal grants, corporate support, training revenue, and philanthropists. Facebook and the Dalio Foundation are among them.

On October 24, 2015, the YCEI collaborated with singer-songwriter Lady Gaga and the Born This Way Foundation to host the Emotion Revolution summit at the Yale School of Management, where they presented a landmark study of 22,000 high school students. This study revealed that the most common words students used to describe their emotions at school were “tired,” “stressed,” and “bored.” The summit brought together 200 high school students, policy makers, and academic officials, to discuss ways to recognize and channel emotions for positive outcomes. 

The center founded InspirEd, an open-source toolkit for educators to learn and teach emotional intelligence in their classrooms.

On January 19, 2021, Dena Simmons resigned from her founding position as Assistant Director after seven years, citing tokenism and discrimination in the workplace.

References 

2013 establishments in Connecticut
Yale University
Emotional intelligence